"Ghost" is a single by American rock band Badflower. It is the lead song off of their debut studio album, OK, I'm Sick. The single was released on June 8, 2018, through Big Machine Records.

Background and recording 

The song is about suicide and attempting suicide. When describing the song in an interview with Forbes, Josh Katz said "What I've learned is to prioritize my own personal life and stop taking the career so seriously. It's a job that I love and I get to connect with people and it's a really, really special thing I get to do."

Initially, the song was written not be a single, although according to Katz, Big Machine Records, encouraged the band to release the song as a single, to Katz's reluctance.

Katz's said in an interview with Loudwire that he wrote the song when he would have panic attacks on stage and after concerts. Katz said that "even though for me I was writing from a place of truth, When it was written I had just gotten off tour, and I spent the entire tour having panic attacks on stage every night. It was just something that came out of nowhere for reasons that only my therapist can tell you. When that happened, I got home and it was a traumatic experience having to deal with that every single night and I was in a really low place. I was depressed and thinking about self-harm. So I just wrote it. I played out the whole scenario and put it into a song because that's what writers do, I suppose. I didn't even know if it was gonna go on the album. I was sorta hesitant to even show it to the rest of my band, But everyone heard it and loved it, and said it might actually be a positive thing to put out in the world. So we did, and it turned out that I was wrong in my skepticism because it was a positive thing."

Music video 
The music video to "Ghost" was released on June 8, 2018.

Charts

Weekly charts

Year-end charts

Certifications

References 

2018 singles
2018 songs
Badflower songs
Songs about suicide
Big Machine Records singles
Song recordings produced by Scott Borchetta